Lyudmila Ivanovna Galkina (born 20 January 1972 in Saratov) is a Russian track and field athlete. She won the European Junior Championships in 1991 as a triple jumper, but thereafter later focused on the long jump. Her greatest achievement was taking the World Championship title in 1997, with a personal best jump of 7.05 metres.

International competitions

See also
List of World Athletics Championships medalists (women)
List of IAAF World Indoor Championships medalists (women)
List of European Athletics Championships medalists (women)
List of European Athletics Indoor Championships medalists (women)

References

 

1972 births
Living people
Sportspeople from Saratov
Russian female long jumpers
Russian female triple jumpers
Olympic female long jumpers
Olympic athletes of Russia
Athletes (track and field) at the 1996 Summer Olympics
Athletes (track and field) at the 2000 Summer Olympics
Universiade bronze medalists for Russia
Universiade medalists in athletics (track and field)
Medalists at the 1995 Summer Universiade
Goodwill Games medalists in athletics
Competitors at the 1998 Goodwill Games
World Athletics Championships athletes for Russia
World Athletics Championships medalists
World Athletics Championships winners
World Athletics Indoor Championships winners
European Athletics Championships medalists
Russian Athletics Championships winners